The Return of Doctor X (also billed as The Return of Dr. X) is a 1939 American science fiction-horror film directed by Vincent Sherman and starring Wayne Morris, Rosemary Lane, and Humphrey Bogart as the title character. It was based on the short story "The Doctor's Secret" by William J. Makin. Despite supposedly being a sequel to Doctor X (1932), also produced by Warner Bros., the films are unrelated.

This was Bogart's only science fiction or horror film.

Plot summary
A pair of bizarre murders occur wherein the victims are drained of their rare Type One blood type. Reporter Walter Garrett consults with his friend Dr. Mike Rhodes which leads them to  Rhodes' former mentor, hematologist Dr. Francis Flegg. Flegg is initially unhelpful, but Garrett and Rhodes notice a striking resemblance between Flegg's strange assistant, Marshall Quesne and the late Dr. Maurice Xavier in old press cuttings. After opening Xavier's grave and finding it empty, they confront Flegg. Flegg admits using his new scientific methods to bring Xavier back from the dead and has employed synthetic blood to sustain his life. However, the blood cannot replace itself, and therefore, Quesne/Xavier must seek out human victims with the rare Type One blood type contained in the formula in order to stay alive.

A hunt begins for Quesne, who has discovered that Joan Vance, a nurse and Rhodes' sweetheart, is a carrier of the rare blood type. He escapes with her in a taxi, professing to be taking her to Rhodes. Barnett and Rhodes, accompanied by the police, track them to their location. Quesne is shot dead, and Joan is saved from the fate of the others.

Cast
 Wayne Morris as Walter Garrett (Barnett in the on-screen credits)
 Rosemary Lane as Joan Vance
 Humphrey Bogart as Dr. Maurice Xavier, a.k.a. Marshall Quesne
 Dennis Morgan as Dr. Mike Rhodes
 John Litel as Dr. Francis Flegg
 Lya Lys as Angela Merrova
 Huntz Hall as Pinky 
 Charles Wilson as Detective Ray Kincaid 
 Vera Lewis as Miss Sweetman 
 Howard Hickman as Chairman (scenes deleted)
 Olin Howland as Undertaker
 Arthur Aylesworth as Guide
 Cliff Saum as Detective Sergeant Moran   
 Creighton Hale as Hotel Manager
 John Ridgely as Rodgers
 Joe Crehan as Editor
 Glen Langan as Interne
 DeWolf Hopper as Interne

See also
 Vampire film

References

External links

 
 
 
 

1939 films
1939 horror films
American science fiction horror films
American black-and-white films
1930s English-language films
Films based on short fiction
Films directed by Vincent Sherman
American sequel films
American vampire films
Warner Bros. films
1930s science fiction horror films
1939 directorial debut films
1930s American films
Films scored by Bernhard Kaun
Resurrection in film